Bruch is a station on the Wuppertal Schwebebahn. It is close to Vohwinkel Deutsche Bahn station.

References

Wuppertal Schwebebahn
Monorail stations
Railway stations in Wuppertal